Williamsville is a village in Sangamon County, Illinois, United States. The population was 1,476 at the 2010 census, and 1,491 at a 2018 estimate. It is part of the Springfield, Illinois Metropolitan Statistical Area.

Geography
Williamsville is located at  (39.950942, -89.550745).

Schools
The Williamsville-Sherman CUSD15 office is located at 800 S. Walnut St., Williamsville, IL 62693
 http://www.wcusd15.org/index.php

Demographics

As of the census of 2000, there were 1,439 people, 531 households, and 417 families residing in the village. The racial makeup of the village was 98.12% White, 0.56% African American, 0.49% Native American, 0.14% Asian, 0.28% from other races, and 0.42% from two or more races. Hispanic or Latino of any race were 0.83% of the population.

There were 531 households, out of which 42.4% had children under the age of 18 living with them, 69.5% were married couples living together, 7.2% had a female householder with no husband present, and 21.3% were non-families. 19.4% of all households were made up of individuals, and 9.0% had someone living alone who was 65 years of age or older. The average household size was 2.71 and the average family size was 3.12.

In the village, the population was spread out, with 29.3% under the age of 18, 7.2% from 18 to 24, 31.1% from 25 to 44, 19.0% from 45 to 64, and 13.5% who were 65 years of age or older. The median age was 36 years. For every 100 females, there were 89.8 males. For every 100 females age 18 and over, there were 89.9 males.

The median income for a household in the village was $50,238, and the median income for a family was $56,012. Males had a median income of $41,169 versus $30,870 for females. The per capita income for the village was $20,201. About 1.8% of families and 3.1% of the population were below the poverty line, including 2.0% of those under age 18 and 4.3% of those age 65 or over.

References

Villages in Sangamon County, Illinois
Villages in Illinois
Springfield metropolitan area, Illinois